The Sardasht Dam is an embankment dam currently under construction on the Little Zab  southeast of Sardasht in the Iranian province of West Azerbaijan. Reconnaissance studies for the dam were completed in 1999 by Moshanir Consulting Engineers Company. It will support a hydroelectric power station with an installed capacity of 150 MW and expected annual generation of 482 GWh. The construction contract for the dam was awarded in 2009. Official construction on the dam began in 2011. The river diversion tunnels were complete in November 2012 in a ceremony attended by Iran's Ministry of Energy Majid Namjoo. The dam began to impound its reservoir on 22 June 2017.

See also

Silveh Dam – under construction upstream on the Lavin River
List of dams and reservoirs in Iran

References

Dams in West Azerbaijan Province
Hydroelectric power stations in Iran
Rock-filled dams
Dams completed in 2018
Dams on the Little Zab River
Sardasht County